Line 1 of the Xi'an Metro is a rapid transit line running from west to east Xi'an. It was opened on 15 September 2013.
The line is colored blue on system maps.

Future Development
Phase 3 of Line 1 is currently under construction and will open in June 2023. The extension is 10.61 km in length with 7 stations.

Opening timeline

Stations (west to east)

References

01
Railway lines opened in 2013
2013 establishments in China